Cora Miao is a Chinese actress who worked predominantly in Hong Kong films. During her career she was nominated for four Hong Kong Film Awards and four Golden Horse Film Festival awards, winning one. She won the Miss Photogenic award in the Miss Hong Kong Pageant in 1976 after graduating from the United States. She is married to film director Wayne Wang.

Awards and nominations

External links
 
Cora Miao Profile

1958 births
Actresses from Shanghai
Living people